Farshad Bahadorani (born August 28, 1982) is an Iranian football midfielder who currently plays for Zob Ahan in the Iran Pro League.

Club career

Club career statistics
Last Update  24 August 2012 

 Assist Goals

References

1982 births
Living people
Iranian footballers
Association football midfielders
Sepahan S.C. footballers
Zob Ahan Esfahan F.C. players
F.C. Aboomoslem players